The 2022–23 Biathlon IBU Cup was a multi-race tournament over a season of biathlon, organised by the IBU. It is the second-rank competition in biathlon after the Biathlon World Cup. The season started on 29 November 2022 in Idre Fjäll, Sweden and ended on 4 March 2023 in Canmore, Canada.

Erlend Bjøntegaard from Norway and Lou Jeanmonnot from France were the defending overall champions from the 2021–22 season.

Map of world cup hosts 
All 9 locations hosting world cup events in this season (including Lenzerheide – venue of the European Championships).

Calendar

Men

Calendar

Standings

Overall

Under 25

Individual

Sprint

Super sprint

Pursuit

Mass start

Nations Cup

Women

Calendar

Standings

Overall

Under 25

Individual

Sprint

Super sprint

Pursuit

Mass start

Nations Cup

Mixed Relay

Rankings

Podium table by nation 
Table showing the World Cup podium places (gold–1st place, silver–2nd place, bronze–3rd place) by the countries represented by the athletes.

See also 
2022–23 Biathlon World Cup

Notes

References

External links 

 IBU official site

IBU Cup
2022 in biathlon
2023 in biathlon